Salvatoris nostri Mater was a papal bull issued by Pope Benedict XIV on 13 December 1740, ending the ecclesiastical division of the city of Lisbon by suppressing the vacant Metropolitan Archdiocese of Eastern Lisbon and incorporating the whole territory into the Patriarchate of Western Lisbon. The civil division of the city was eventually abolished by King John V, on 31 August 1741.

This bull also granted the canons of the patriarchal chapter the honorific title of Principal.

References

External links
Transcription of the bull; in Sousa, António Caetano de (1746). Prova da Historia Genealogica da Casa Real Portugueza, Tome V.

1740 works
18th-century papal bulls
Documents of Pope Benedict XIV